Afzalabad (also Romanized as Afẕalābād; also known as Afẕalābād Sar Kal and Asadābād) is a village in Shusef Rural District, Shusef District, Nehbandan County, South Khorasan Province, Iran. At the 2006 census, its population was 173, in 34 families.

References 

Populated places in Nehbandan County